The Battle of Red Cliffs, also known as the Battle of Chibi, was a decisive naval battle in the winter of AD 208–209 at the end of the Han dynasty, about twelve years prior to the beginning of the Three Kingdoms period in Chinese history. The battle was fought between the allied forces of the southern warlords Sun Quan, Liu Bei, and Liu Qi against the numerically-superior forces of the northern warlord Cao Cao. Liu Bei and Sun Quan frustrated Cao Cao's effort to conquer the land south of the Yangtze River and reunite the territory of the Eastern Han dynasty.

The allied victory at Red Cliffs ensured the survival of Liu Bei and Sun Quan, gave them control of the Yangtze, and provided a line of defence that was the basis for the later creation of the two southern states of Shu Han and Eastern Wu. According to Norwich University, this was the largest naval battle in history in terms of the numbers involved. Descriptions of the battle differ widely and the site of the battle is fiercely debated. Although its location remains uncertain, most academic conjectures place it on the south bank of the Yangtze River, southwest of present-day Wuhan and northeast of Baqiu (present-day Yueyang, Hunan).

Background

By the early 3rd century, the nearly four century old Han dynasty was crumbling. Emperor Xian had been a political figurehead since 189 with no control over the regional warlords. Cao Cao was one of the most powerful warlords. By 207 he had reunified northern China and controlled the North China Plain. In the winter of 207 he secured the northern flank by defeating Wuhuan at the Battle of White Wolf Mountain. Upon returning in 208, Cao Cao was appointed Chancellor, which gave him control of the imperial government.

Cao Cao's southern campaign started shortly after in the autumn of 208. The Yangtze River through Jing Province was the first target; capturing the naval base at Jiangling and securing naval control of the province's stretch of the Yangtze were necessary to secure access to the south. He was opposed by warlords Liu Biao and Sun Quan. Liu Biao, the governor of Jing, controlled the Yangtze west of the Han River's mouth, which roughly encompassed the territory around the city of Xiakou and to the south. Sun Quan controlled the Yangtze east of the Han and the southeastern territories abutting it. A third warlord, Liu Bei, was in Fancheng, having fled with Liu Biao from the northeast after a failed plot to assassinate Cao Cao and restore imperial power.

Initially, Cao Cao achieved rapid success. Jing was in a poor state. Its armies were exhausted by conflict with Sun Quan to the south. Furthermore, there was political division as Liu Biao's sons, the elder Liu Qi and the younger Liu Cong, sought to succeed their father. Liu Cong prevailed, and Liu Qi was relegated to the commandery of Jiangxia. Liu Biao died of illness only a few weeks later. Liu Cong surrendered to an advancing Cao Cao, giving the latter a sizeable fleet and Jiangling as a forward operating base.

Cao Cao's advance forced Liu Bei into a disorganized southward retreat accompanied by refugees and pursued by Cao Cao's elite cavalry. Liu Bei was surrounded and decisively defeated at the Battle of Changban but escaped eastward to Xiakou, where he liaised with Sun Quan's emissary Lu Su. Historical accounts are inconsistent; Lu Su may have successfully encouraged Liu Bei to move further east to Fankou (樊口, around present-day Ezhou, Hubei). In either case, Liu Bei was later joined by Liu Qi and levies from Jiangxia.

Liu Bei's main advisor, Zhuge Liang, was sent to Chaisang (柴桑; in present-day Jiujiang, Jiangxi) to negotiate an alliance with Sun Quan against Cao Cao. Zhuge Liang told Sun Quan that Liu Bei and Liu Qi each had 10,000 men; these numbers may have been exaggerated, but however large a force the pair fielded was no match against Cao Cao's in an open battle. Sun Quan received a letter from Cao Cao prior to Zhuge Liang's arrival; in it Cao Cao claimed to have 800,000 men and hinted that he wanted Sun Quan to surrender. Zhang Zhao, Sun Quan's Chief Clerk, supported surrendering based on the disparity in forces. Zhuge Liang was supported by Lu Su and Zhou Yu, Sun Quan's chief commander. Sun Quan agreed to the alliance; he chopped off a corner of his desk during an assembly and stated, "Anyone who still dares argue for surrender will be [treated] the same as this desk." Zhou Yu, Cheng Pu, and Lu Su were assigned 30,000 men and sent to aid Liu Bei.

Zhou Yu estimated Cao Cao's strength to be closer to 230,000. This included 80,000 impressed from Ying, and whose morale and loyalty to Cao Cao were uncertain. With Liu Bei's 20,000 soldiers, the alliance had approximately 50,000 marines who were trained and prepared for battle.

Battle

The Battle of Red Cliffs unfolded in three stages: an initial skirmish at Red Cliffs followed by a retreat to the Wulin (烏林) battlefields on the northwestern bank of the Yangtze, a decisive naval engagement, and Cao Cao's disastrous retreat along Huarong Road.

The combined Sun-Liu force sailed upstream from either Xiakou or Fankou to Red Cliffs, where they encountered Cao Cao's vanguard force. Plagued by disease and low morale because of the series of forced marches that they had undertaken on the prolonged southern campaign, Cao Cao's men could not gain an advantage in the small skirmish which ensued and so he retreated to Wulin, north of the Yangtze River, and the allies pulled back to the south.

Cao Cao had chained his ships from stem to stern, possibly with the aim of reducing seasickness in his navy, which was composed mostly of northerners who were not used to living on ships. Observing that, the divisional commander Huang Gai sent Cao Cao a letter feigning surrender and prepared a squadron of capital ships described as mengchong doujian (蒙衝鬥艦). The ships had been converted into fire ships by filling them with bundles of kindling, dry reeds, and fatty oil. As Huang Gai's "defecting" squadron approached the midpoint of the river, the sailors applied fire to the ships before they took to small boats. The unmanned fire ships, carried by the southeastern wind, sped towards Cao Cao's fleet and set it ablaze. Many men and horses either burned to death or drowned.

Following the initial shock, Zhou Yu and the allies led a lightly-armed force to capitalise on the assault. The northern army was thrown into confusion and utterly defeated. Seeing the situation was hopeless, Cao Cao then issued a general order of retreat and destroyed a number of his remaining ships before he withdrew.

Cao Cao's army attempted a retreat along Huarong Road, including a long stretch passing through marshlands north of Dongting Lake. Heavy rains had made the road so treacherous that many of the sick soldiers had to carry bundles of grass on their backs and use them to fill the road to allow the horsemen to cross. Many of these soldiers drowned in the mud or were trampled to death in the effort. The allies, led by Zhou Yu and Liu Bei, gave chase over land and water until they reached Nan Commandery. Combined with famine and disease, that decimated Cao Cao's remaining forces. Cao Cao then retreated north to his home base of Ye and left Cao Ren and Xu Huang to guard Jiangling, Yue Jin stationed in Xiangyang, and Man Chong was in Dangyang.

The allied counterattack might have vanquished Cao Cao and his forces entirely. However, the crossing of the Yangtze River had dissolved into chaos as the allied armies converged on the riverbank and fought over the limited number of ferries. To restore order, a detachment led by Sun Quan's general Gan Ning established a bridgehead in Yiling to the north, and only a staunch rearguard action by Cao Ren prevented a further catastrophe.

Analysis

A combination of Cao Cao's strategic errors and the effectiveness of Huang Gai's ruse had resulted in the allied victory at the Battle of Red Cliffs. Zhou Yu had observed that Cao Cao's generals and soldiers were mostly cavalry and infantry, and few had any experience in naval warfare. Cao Cao also had little support among the people of Jing Province and so lacked a secure forward base of operations. Despite the strategic acumen that Cao Cao had displayed in earlier campaigns and battles, he had simply assumed in this case that numerical superiority would eventually defeat the Sun and Liu navy. Cao's first tactical mistake was converting his massive army of infantry and cavalry into a marine corps and navy. With only a few days of drills before the battle, Cao Cao's troops were ravaged by sea-sickness and lack of experience on water. Tropical diseases to which the southerners were largely immune were also rampant in Cao Cao's camps. Although numerous, Cao Cao's men were already exhausted by the unfamiliar environment and the extended southern campaign, as Zhuge Liang observed: "Even a powerful arrow at the end of its flight cannot penetrate a silk cloth."

A key advisor, Jia Xu, had recommended after the surrender of Liu Cong for the overtaxed armies to be given time to rest and to replenish before they engaged the armies of Sun Quan and Liu Bei, but Cao Cao disregarded that advice. Cao Cao's own thoughts regarding his failure at Red Cliffs suggest that he held his own actions and misfortunes responsible for the defeat, rather than the strategies utilized by his enemy during the battle: "it was only because of the sickness that I burnt my ships and retreated. It is out of all reason for Zhou Yu to take the credit for himself."

Aftermath

By the end of 209, the post that Cao Cao had established at Jiangling fell to Zhou Yu. For the victors of the battle, however, the question arose on how to share the spoils. Initially, Liu Bei and Liu Qi both expected rewards, having participated to the success at Red Cliffs, and both had also become entrenched in Jing Province. Liu Qi was appointed Inspector of Jing Province, but his rule in the region, centered at Jiangxia Commandery, was short-lived. A few months after the Battle of Red Cliffs, he died of sickness. His lands were mostly absorbed by Sun Quan. However, with Liu Qi dead, Liu Bei laid claim to the title of Inspector of Jing Province and began to occupy much of it. He gained control of the four commanderies (Wuling, Changsha, Lingling, and Guiyang) south of the Yangtze River. Sun Quan's troops had suffered far greater casualties than Liu Bei's in the extended conflict against Cao Ren following the Battle of Red Cliffs, and the death of Zhou Yu in 210 resulted in a drastic weakening of Sun Quan's strength in Jing Province. 

As Liu Bei occupied Jing Province, which Cao Cao had recently lost, he gained a strategic and naturally-fortified area on the Yangtze River that Sun Quan still intended for himself. The control of Jing Province provided Liu Bei with virtually-unlimited access to the passage into Yi Province and important waterways into Wu (southeastern China) and dominion of the southern Yangtze River. Never again would Cao Cao command so large a fleet as he did at Jiangling, and he never had another similar opportunity to destroy his southern rivals. The Battle of Red Cliffs and the capture of Jing Province by Liu Bei confirmed the separation of southern China from the northern heartland of the Yellow River valley and foreshadowed a north-south axis of hostility that would continue for centuries.

Location

The precise location of the Red Cliffs battlefield has long been the subject of both popular and academic debates, but it has never been conclusively established. Scholarly debates have continued for at least 1350 years, and a number of arguments in favour of alternative sites have been put forward. There are clear grounds for rejecting at least some of these proposals, but four alternative locations are still advocated. According to Zhang, many of the current debates stem from the fact that the course and length of the Yangtze River between Wuli and Wuhan has changed since the Sui and Tang dynasties. The modern debate is also complicated by the fact that the names of some of the key locations have changed over the following centuries. For example, modern Huarong city is located in Hunan, south of the Yangtze, but in the 3rd century, the city of that name was due east of Jiangling, considerably north of the Yangtze. Moreover, one of the sites, Puqi (蒲圻), was renamed "Chibi City" (赤壁市) in 1998 in a direct attempt to tie the location to the historical battlefield.

Historical records state that Cao Cao's forces retreated north across the Yangtze after the initial engagement at Red Cliffs, which unequivocally places the battle site on the south bank of the Yangtze. For this reason, a number of sites on the north bank have been discounted by historians and geographers. Historical accounts also establish eastern and western boundaries for a stretch of the Yangtze that encompasses all of the possible sites for the battlefield. The allied forces traveled upstream from either Fankou or Xiakou. Since the Yangtze flows roughly eastward towards the ocean (with northeast and southeast meanders), Red Cliffs must at least be west of Fankou, which is farther downstream. The westernmost boundary is also clear since Cao Cao's eastern advance from Jiangling included passing Baqiu (present-day Yueyang, Hunan) on the shore of Dongting Lake. The battle must also have been downstream (northeast) of that place.

One popular candidate for the battle site is Chibi Hill in Huangzhou, sometimes referred to as "Su Dongpo's Red Cliffs" or the "Literary Red Cliffs" (文赤壁). This conjecture arises largely from the famous 11th-century poem "First Rhapsody on the Red Cliffs", which equates the Huangzhou Hill with the battlefield location. Excluding tone marks, the contemporary Mandarin pinyin romanization of the cliff's name is "Chibi", the same as the pinyin for Red Cliffs. However, the Chinese characters are completely different (赤鼻), as is their meaning ("Red Nose Hill"), and the contemporaneous pronunciation of the words are also different, which is reflected by their distinct pronunciations in many non-Mandarin dialects. Consequently, virtually all scholars have dismissed the connection. The site is also on the north bank of the Yangtze and is directly across from Fankou, rather than upstream from it. Moreover, if the allied Sun-Liu forces left from Xiakou rather than Fankou, as the oldest historical sources suggest, the hill in Huangzhou would have been downstream from the point of departure, a possibility that cannot be reconciled with historical sources.

Puqi, now called Chibi City, is perhaps the most widely accepted candidate. To differentiate from Su Dongpo's Red Cliffs, the site is also referred to as the "Military Red Cliffs" (武赤壁). It is directly across the Yangtze from Wulin. That argument was first proposed in the early Tang dynasty. There are also characters engraved in the cliffs (see image at the top of this page), which suggested that was the site of the battle. The origin of the engraving can be dated to between the Tang and Song dynasties, which makes it at least 1,000 years old.

Some sources mention the south banks of the Yangtze in Jiayu County (嘉鱼县) in the prefecture-level city of Xianning in Hubei province as a possible location. That would place the battlefield downstream from Puqi (Chibi City), a view that is supported by scholars of Chinese history such as de Crespigny, Wang Li, and Zhu Dongrun, who follow the Qing dynasty historical document Shui Jing Zhu.

Another candidate is Wuhan, which straddles the Yangtze at the confluence of the Yangtze and Han rivers. It is east of both Wulin (and Chibi City across the river) and Jiayu. The metropolis was incorporated by joining three cities. There is a local belief in Wuhan that the battle was fought at the junction of the rivers, southwest of the former Wuchang city, which is now part of Wuhan. Zhang asserts that the Chibi battlefield was one of a set of hills in Wuchang levelled in the 1930s so that their stone could be used as raw material. Citing several historical-geographical studies, Zhang shows that earlier accounts place the battlefield in Wuchang.

Fictionalised account

The romantic tradition that originated with the 14th-century historical novel Romance of the Three Kingdoms differs from historical accounts in many details. For example, Cao Cao's army strength was exaggerated to over 830,000 men. That may be attributed to the ethos of later times, particularly of the Southern Song dynasty. The state of Shu Han, in particular, was viewed by later literati as the "legitimate" successor to the Han dynasty and so fictionalised accounts assign greater prominence than is warranted by historical records to the roles of Liu Bei, Zhuge Liang and other heroes from Shu. That is generally accomplished by minimising the importance of Eastern Wu commanders and advisors such as Zhou Yu and Lu Su. While historical accounts describe Lu Su as a sensible advisor and Zhou Yu as an eminent military leader and "generous, sensible and courageous" man, Romance of the Three Kingdoms depicts Lu Su as unremarkable and Zhou Yu as cruel and cynical. Both are depicted as being inferior to Zhuge Liang in every respect.

The romances added wholly fictional and fantastical elements to the historical accounts, and these were repeated in popular plays and operas. Examples from the Romance of the Three Kingdoms include Zhuge Liang pretending to use magic to call forth favourable winds for the fire ship attack, his strategy of "using straw boats to borrow arrows", and Guan Yu capturing and releasing Cao Cao at Huarong Trail. The fictionalised accounts also name Zhuge Liang as a military commander in the combined forces, which is historically inaccurate.

Cultural impact
The modern Chibi City, in Hubei Province, used to be called Puqi. In 1998, the Chinese State Council approved the renaming of the city in celebration of the battle at Red Cliffs. Cultural festivals held by the city have dramatically increased tourism. In 1983, a statue of prominent Song dynasty poet, Su Shi, was erected at the Huangzhou site of 'lasu Dongpo's Red Cliffs in tribute to his writings regarding Red Cliff.

Video games based on the Three Kingdoms era (such as Koei's Dynasty Warriors series, Sangokushi Koumeiden, Warriors Orochi series, Destiny of an Emperor, Kessen II and Total War: Three Kingdoms) have scenarios that include the battle. Other games use the Battle of Red Cliffs as their central focus with titles popular in Asia, such as the original Japanese version of Warriors of Fate and Dragon Throne: Battle of Red Cliffs.

A 2008 film, Red Cliff, was directed by John Woo, showcased the Red Cliff legacy, and was a massive box office success.

Notes

References

Sources

 .
 .
 .

 .
  Internet Edition 2004.

  Internet Edition 2004.
  Internet edition.
 .
 .
 .
 .
 .

208
Red Cliffs 208
Red Cliffs 208
Red Cliffs
Yangtze River
Red Cliffs
Liu Bei
Cao Cao